Tim Dickinson is an American political correspondent. Based in Portland, Oregon, he is a contributing editor to Rolling Stone. His article "Machinery of Hope" about U.S. president Barack Obama's 2008 political campaign was anthologized in The Best American Political Writing 2008 (Public Affairs). His other work includes six years as an editor of Mother Jones magazine, and as a writer for Outside, Wired, and local San Francisco magazines.

Career
Dickinson has more than 15 years experience as writer and editor for national magazines. While working for Mother Jones, he was the Articles Editor for six years. In 2001, he was part of the team that was awarded a National Magazine Award for General Excellence. The team was also nominated again in 2003. Dickinson is a regular guest on cable news, including appearances on MSNBC, CNN, Current, and Al Jazeera English.

Works
Dickinson is co-author of "Lie-by-lie," a writing on the Iraq war. This piece was a National Magazine Award finalist in 2007 for best Interactive Feature.

References

External links
Dickinson at Huffington Post
Dickinson at Mother Jones
Dickinson at Rolling Stone

Year of birth missing (living people)
American political writers
American male non-fiction writers
Living people